The saxhorn  is a family of valved brass instruments that have conical bores and deep cup-shaped mouthpieces. The saxhorn family was developed by Adolphe Sax, who is also known for creating the saxophone family. The sound of the saxhorn has a characteristic mellow tone quality and blends well with other brass.

The saxhorn family 

The saxhorns form a family of seven brass instruments (although at one point ten different sizes seem to have existed). Designed for band use, they are pitched alternately in E and B, like the saxophone group.

Modern saxhorns still manufactured and in use:
B soprano saxhorn: flugelhorn
E alto/tenor saxhorn: alto/tenor horn
B baritone saxhorn: baritone horn 
The B bass, E bass, and B contrabass saxhorns are basically the same as the modern euphonium, E bass tuba, and BB contrabass tuba, respectively.

Historically, much confusion exists as to the nomenclature of the various instruments in different languages.

The following table lists the members of the saxhorn family as described in the orchestration texts of Hector Berlioz and Cecil Forsyth, the J. Howard Foote catalog of 1893, and modern names. The modern instrument names continue to exhibit inconsistency, denoted by a "/" between the two names in use. In the table "Pitch" means the concert pitch of notational Middle C on each instrument (2nd partial, no valves depressed) in scientific pitch notation.

This list is not exhaustive of historic nomenclature for the saxhorns, for which there may exist no comprehensive and authoritative source.

Ranges of individual members 
The saxhorn is based on the same three-valve system as most other valved brass instruments. Each member of the family is named after the root note produced by the second partial with no valves actuated. Each member nominally possesses or possessed the typical three-valve brass range from the note one tritone below that root note (second partial, all valves actuated) to the note produced by eighth partial with no valves actuated, i.e., the note two octaves above the root note.

All the modern members of the family are transposing instruments written in the treble clef with the root note produced by the second partial with no valves actuated being written as middle C, though the baritone horn often plays bass clef parts, especially in concert band music and when playing parts written for the trombone.

History 
Developed during the mid-to-late 1830s, the saxhorn family was patented in Paris in 1845 by Adolphe Sax. During the 19th century, the debate as to whether the saxhorn family was truly new, or rather a development of previously existing instruments, was the subject of prolonged lawsuits.

Throughout the mid-1850s, Sax continued to experiment with the instrument's valve pattern.

The Trojan March (Marche Troyenne) of the Berlioz opera Les Troyens (185658) features an on-stage band which includes a family of saxhorns. The Royal Hunt and Storm (Chasse Royale) from the same opera uses them orchestrally. Sir John Eliot Gardiner wanted to use them in his 2003 recording, but was unable to borrow them from major conservatoires; he was eventually put in touch with a private collector who loaned him a set.

Saxhorns were popularized by the distinguished Distin Quintet, who toured Europe during the mid-19th century. This family of musicians, publishers and instrument manufacturers had a significant impact on the growth of the brass band movement in Britain during the mid- to late-19th century.

The saxhorn was the most common brass instrument in American Civil War bands.  The over-the-shoulder variety of the instrument was used, as the backward-pointing bell of the instrument allowed troops marching behind the band to hear the music.

Contemporary works featuring this instrument are Désiré Dondeyne's Tubissimo for bass tuba or saxhorn and piano (1983), Olivier Messiaen's Et exspecto resurrectionem mortuorum (1964), and Dmitri Shostakovich's "March of the Soviet Militia" (1970).

See also 
Alto horn
Baritone horn
Flugelhorn
Euphonium
Sudrophone

References 

 J. Howard Foote catalog, 1893

Discography 
 Saxhorn et piano - Hybrid'Music Label - October 2008
 David Maillot, saxhorn - Géraldine Dutroncy, piano – Works by Eugène Bozza, Marcel Bitsch, Jacques Castérède, Alain Bernaud, Henri Tomasi, Claude Pascal, Gérard Devos, and Roger Boutry.
 14 Volumes of saxhorn band are available featuring The First Brigade Band.

External links 
 Dodworth Saxhorn Band
 Greg's Brass History Page
 First Brigade Band
 Galpin Society list of extant Adolphe Sax instruments 
 

Brass instruments
B-flat instruments
E-flat instruments
Horns